The 1890 Brooklyn Gladiators baseball team finished with a 26–73 record, last place in the American Association during their only season in existence. The team failed to finish the season, folding after their game against the Syracuse Stars on August 25. They were replaced by the resurrected Baltimore Orioles franchise, which had left the league at the end of the 1889 season.

Regular season

Season standings

Record vs. opponents

Opening Day lineup

Roster

Player stats

Batting

Starters by position 
Note: Pos = Position; G = Games played; AB = At bats; H = Hits; Avg. = Batting average; HR = Home runs; RBI = Runs batted in

Other batters 
Note: G = Games played; AB = At bats; H = Hits; Avg. = Batting average; HR = Home runs; RBI = Runs batted in

Pitching

Starting pitchers 
Note: G = Games pitched; IP = Innings pitched; W = Wins; L = Losses; ERA = Earned run average; SO = Strikeouts

Other pitchers 
Note: G = Games pitched; IP = Innings pitched; W = Wins; L = Losses; ERA = Earned run average; SO = Strikeouts

References 
 1890 Brooklyn Gladiators team page at Baseball Reference

Brooklyn Gladiators season